The 2015 Republican National Committee (RNC) chairmanship election was held on January 16, 2015. Then-incumbent RNC Chairman Reince Priebus won re-election with near unanimity in the party's 2015 meeting, putting him on course to become the longest-serving head of the national party in history.

Candidates
Reince Priebus, then-incumbent RNC Chairman

References

National Committee
Republican National Committee Chairmanship Election, 2015
Republican Party (United States) leadership elections
Republican National Committee chairmanship election